The 1970–71 Honduran Segunda División was the fifth season of the Honduran Segunda División.  Under the management of Joaquín Padilla, C.D. Troya won the tournament after defeating C.D. Lenca in the final series and obtained promotion to the 1971–72 Honduran Liga Nacional.

Final

 Troya won 6–5 on aggregate.

References

Segunda
1970